Canace actites, is a European species of Canacidae.

Distribution
It is only known from the Canary Island of Tenerife and from Madeira.

References

Canacidae
Muscomorph flies of Europe
Insects described in 1982